Avenida Presidente Masaryk is a thoroughfare in the affluent Polanco neighborhood of Mexico City. It stretches from Calzada General Mariano Escobedo in the east to Avenida Ferrocarril de Cuernavaca in the west, passing along the north side of the Polanquito restaurant district that borders Parque Lincoln. Masaryk is one of the most expensive shopping districts in the world and competes with Avenida Madero in the Historic Center for the title of street with the highest rents in the city.

History 
President Lázaro Cárdenas named the avenue after the first President of Czechoslovakia, Tomáš Garrigue Masaryk in 1936. 

In 1999 the city of Prague donated a statue of Masaryk to Mexico City, one of the two originals made when the statue for the Prague Castle was being prepared for the 150th anniversary of his birth. The statue was placed in the roundabout at the intersection of Av. Presidente Masaryk and Arquímedes on 28 October 2000, on the Czechoslovak National Day.

The name of the street is often misspelled e.g. "Mazarik" or "Mazaryk". The City of Mexico decided to correct the signs under its control in 2000 (street, highway and other signs), but the incorrect names remained on some of the local shops.

Renovation 2013–2015
In 2013 Seduvi, the Ministry of Urban Development and Housing of the Federal District, decided to invest 480 million pesos for the urban renewal of the street, with an emphasis on making it more walkable. Half of this budget will be contributed by the government, with the rest coming from the private sector and a tax being levied on the residents and businesses who will benefit from the rehabilitation.

The project was a complete overhaul of infrastructure, it included: granite sidewalks, hydraulic concrete, landscaping (including the replacement of unhealthy trees), new benches and bike racks, energy efficient light posts, replacement of aging water supply and drainage systems, and the replacement of overhead electricity/telephone cables with an underground system. The rehabilitation, which was completed in phases, started in January 2014 and was expected to last 18 months. The avenue was officially reinaugurated on 8 and 9 August 2015 with a cultural event that included a performance by Kalimba, a marathon and group yoga, among other activities.

Masaryk today
Masaryk now faces competition from upscale shopping centers in the far west of the city such as Centro Santa Fe, Arcos Lomas and Paseo Interlomas; nonetheless it is still considered the standard for shopping in Mexico City.

Points of interest
Other than boutiques of world's biggest designer brands, landmarks along Masaryk include:
 Pasaje Polanco, a smaller but historic collection of shops around a courtyard, built in the 1930s in Colonial Californiano style (Mexican interpretation of California Spanish Colonial Revival architecture)
 National Conservatory of Music at the far west end of the street.

References

Streets in Mexico City
Miguel Hidalgo, Mexico City
Shopping districts and streets in Mexico
Retailing in Mexico City
Polanco, Mexico City